Derek Hugh Taylor (born 1 October 1951) is a Turks and Caicos Islander politician who served as the 6th Chief Minister of the Turks and Caicos Islands from 31 January 1995 to 15 August 2004. He is the former leader of the People's Democratic Movement (PDM) party.

He was re-elected to the Turks and Caicos Islands House of Assembly as an at-large member in the 2012 general elections but later lost his seat in the 2021 general elections as he didn't make it into the top 5 At-Large, as received the 9th most votes with 2,352 votes.

Notes

External links

1951 births
Living people
Chief Ministers of the Turks and Caicos Islands
People's Democratic Movement (Turks and Caicos Islands) politicians